Jinghi is a rural locality in the Western Downs Region, Queensland, Australia.

Jinghi's postcodeis 4410.

Geography 

Canaga Creek rises in the north-east to the locality and flows south-west through the locality exiting to Canaga / Langlands to the west. The creek takes its name for a pastoral run held during the early 1850s by Arthur Lloyd and transferred to Joshua and Alexander Bell in 1853. Jingi Jingi Creek rises in neighbouring Diamondy and enters this locality from the east and then flows south-west to exit this locality from the south to Tuckerang. Both creeks are tributaries of the Condamine River and part of the Murray-Darling drainage basin.

The north-west corner of the locality is within Nudley State Forest which extends into neighbouring Fairyland and Burra Burri. Apart from the forest the land use is mostly grazing on native vegetation (more to the north of the locality) and crop growing (more to the south of the locality).

The Jandowae Connection Road (State Route 82) enters from the south, where it meets the Chinchilla–Wondai Road. This road continues north-east as State Route 82, and also runs west with no shield.

History 
The locality was originally known as Jinghi Valley, which took its name from the pastoral run Jinghi Jinghi operated by Joseph King in 1849 and may have originally been part of Jimbour. The name is probably an Aboriginal word.

Jinghi Gully State School opened on 5 July 1915. In 1952 it was renamed Jinghi Valley State School. It closed in 1967. It was on the southern corner of Jinghi Gully Road and Grundys Road.

Jinghi Lower State School opened on 30 May 1916 and closed on 24 January 1960. It was at Lower Jinghi School Road.

Jinghi District Hall was officially opened on Saturday 4 February 1933 by Jim Sparkes, the local Member of the Queensland Legislative Assembly for Dalby.

Economy 
There are a number of homesteads in the locality:

 Belhaville
 Bricabrac
 Cabandah
 Cabandilla
 Clayburn
 Jinghi Jinghi
 Kia-Ora
 Mayfield
 Mayfield
 Millwood
 Omeo
 Taldra
 The Rest
There are some historic stock routes and associated camping reserves in Jinghi. Although officially still open, they are unused.

Education 
There are no schools in Jinghi. The nearest primary schools are Burra Burri State School in neighbouring Burra Burri to the north-west and Jandowae State School in neighbouring Jandowae to the south-east. The nearest secondary school is Jandowae State School which provides secondary schooling to Year 10. For schooling to Year 12, the nearest secondary schools are Chinchilla State High School in Chinchilla to the west and Dalby State High School in Dalby.

Amenities 
Jandowae Golf Club is a 18-hole golf course at 19 Braziers Road open to the public.

Jinghi District Hall is at 230 Grundys Road.

References

Further reading 

 
 
 

Western Downs Region
Localities in Queensland